Cao Xuetao (born July 19, 1964) is a Chinese immunologist who has served as president of Nankai University since January 2018.

Biography
Cao was born in Jinan, Shandong, China on July 19, 1964. In September 1981 he was accepted to the Second Military Medical University in Shanghai, where he received his doctorate in medicine in 1986 and completed his post-graduate studies in immunology in 1990. After graduation, he was a lecturer and then professor (1993) at the Second Military Medical University, as one of the youngest medical professors at that time. He also served as chairman of the Department (1995-2011), Director of the Institute of Immunology (2000-2011) and Vice President of the University (2004-2011). In July 2005 he was awarded the military rank of major general (shao jiang).

He was president of the Chinese Academy of Medical Sciences between August 2011 and November 2015. In August 2010 he became vice president of Peking Union Medical College, rising to president in November 2015. In January 2018 he was appointed president of Nankai University, a vice-ministerial level position.
He also served as president of the Chinese Society of Immunology (2006-2014), the Federation of Immunological Societies of Asia-Oceania (2012-2015) and the Global Alliance for Chronic Diseases (2014-2015).

In January 2018 he became a member of the 13th National Committee of the Chinese People's Political Consultative Conference.

Honours and awards
 State Science and Technology Progress Award (Third Class)
 2005 Member of the Chinese Academy of Engineering (CAE)
 2013 Member of the German Academy of Sciences Leopoldina 
 2014 Foreign Associate Member of the Académie Nationale de Médecine of France
 2014 Associate Member of the European Molecular Biology Organization
 2015 Lifetime Achievement Award for Mentoring in Science by Nature
 2016 Member of the British Academy of Medical Sciences 
 October 16, 2017 International Member of the US National Academy of Medicine
 April 18, 2018 Foreign Honorary Member of the American Academy of Arts and Sciences (AAAS)

Investigation
On November 13, 2019, American biologist Elisabeth Bik wrote on PubPeer that about 40 papers co-authored by Cao used unexpectedly similar images, a sign of possible manipulation, although Bik said many of these could be honest errors. So far, no results have been announced, and netizens noticed a public smear campaign on American scientists from Harvard. On November 18, the Chinese Academy of Engineering (CAE) announced that it is investigating the claim. The June 26, 2020 issue of the Journal of Biological Chemistry announced "expressions of concern" on 12 articles on which Cao was corresponding author.

Personal life
Cao is married and has a son, who received his doctoral degree at Harvard and is now in Xie Xiaoliang laboratory at Peking University.

Selected papers

References

1964 births
People from Jinan
Living people
PLA Second Military Medical University alumni
Chinese immunologists
Members of the Chinese Academy of Engineering
Biologists from Shandong
Presidents of Nankai University
Members of the National Academy of Medicine
Fellows of the American Academy of Arts and Sciences
Académie Nationale de Médecine
Fellows of the Academy of Medical Sciences (United Kingdom)
Academic staff of Peking Union Medical College
Educators from Shandong
Members of the German Academy of Sciences Leopoldina
Members of the 14th Chinese People's Political Consultative Conference